Rondo is an unincorporated community in Polk County, in the U.S. state of Missouri.

History
A post office called Rondo was established in 1858, and remained in operation until 1919. An early postmaster named Rondo gave the community his last name.

References

Unincorporated communities in Polk County, Missouri
Unincorporated communities in Missouri